Dysoxylum championii is a tree in the Meliaceae family. It is endemic to Sri Lanka.

Culture
Known as "gon panaa — ගොන් පනා" in Sinhala.

References

 http://plants.jstor.org/specimen/k000657033

championii
Flora of Sri Lanka